Dedi (or Dedo) II (died 1069), called the Younger, was the Margrave of the Saxon Ostmark (also called Lower Lusatia) in 1069.

Dedi II was the eldest son of Dedi I of the Saxon Ostmark and his first wife, Oda, daughter of Theitmar of the Saxon Ostmark. Sometime after 1063, he was given the Sword of Attila by Otto of Nordheim, who had acquired it from Queen Anastasia of Hungary.

After his father's rebellion against Henry IV of Germany in Summer 1069, Dedi II was given his father's title Margrave of Lower Lusatia. Later that same year (before 26 October 1069), Dedi was murdered while relieving himself at night, and thus predeceased his father. It was rumoured that Dedi's stepmother, Adela, was behind his assassination. The Sword of Attila was confiscated by the king upon Dedi's death.

Notes

References
Lampert of Hersfeld, Annales, in O. Holder-Egger (ed.), Lamperti monachi Hersfeldensis Opera, MGH SS rer Germ 38 (Hanover, 1894).
I.S. Robinson, The Annals of Lampert of Hersfeld (Manchester, 2015)

External links
Medieval Lands Project: Nobility of Meissen.

Margraves of Lusatia
1069 deaths
Year of birth unknown